West Pittston is a borough in the Greater Pittston area of Luzerne County, Pennsylvania, United States. It is located on the Susquehanna River (opposite of Pittston City). In 2020, the population was 4,644.

The town once produced mine screens, glass, crackers, and many other goods. West Pittston rose to national attention in September 2011, when catastrophic flooding (caused by the remnants of Tropical Storm Lee) left much of the borough under water.

History

West Pittston was settled in the 1770s. On July 1, 1778, during the Revolutionary War, Fort Jenkins (a patriot stockade in present-day West Pittston) surrendered to the British (under Major John Butler). It was later burned to the ground. On July 3, the Battle of Wyoming was fought only several miles outside of West Pittston. It was incorporated as a borough in 1857. The West Pittston Police Department was also established that same year.  West Pittston was the home of Company D, 1st Battalion, 109th Infantry Regiment, which is part of the 28th Infantry Division.

Two bridges were constructed over the Susquehanna River connecting Pittston City and West Pittston. In 1914, the Penn Bridge Company constructed the Water Street Bridge. Today, the Water Street Bridge (Firefighters’ Memorial Bridge) is illuminated by fiber optic cable. The colors of the lights can be changed manually to reflect holidays and local sporting rivalries.

In 1928, a parallel bridge (the Fort Jenkins Bridge) was constructed north of the Water Street Bridge. The Fort Jenkins Bridge, which was later renamed the Dale J. Kridlo Memorial Bridge, is part of U.S. Route 11. U.S. 11 runs through the heart of West Pittston.

In June 1972, Hurricane Agnes was responsible for massive flooding in and around the Greater Pittston area. From 1974 to 1989, alleged ghost hauntings took place in the home of Jack and Janet Smurl in West Pittston; it inspired the 1991 film The Haunted.

On September 8, 2011, the Susquehanna River, spurred by heavy rains from Tropical Storm Lee, crested at a record . It flooded more than a quarter of the town. This was considered to be a historic flooding event which displaced thousands of people and caused millions of dollars in damages to businesses and homes. Following record flooding, the non-profit organization West Pittston Tomorrow was founded. Its purpose was to improve the damaged community. It expanded the public library and created community gardens.

Geography
West Pittston is located at  (41.329265, -75.799048).

West Pittston lies on the western side of the Susquehanna River in northern Luzerne County. The City of Wilkes-Barre is located to the southwest. The City of Pittston is located directly across the river (to the east). The borough is situated within the Wyoming Area School District.

Demographics

As of the census of 2000, there were 5,072 people, 2,243 households, and 1,397 families residing in the borough. The racial makeup of the borough was 98.8% White, 0.3% African American, 0.00% Native American, 0.1% Asian, 0.00% from other races, and 0.3% from two or more races. Hispanic or Latino of any race were 0.4% of the population.

There were 2,243 households, out of which 24.2% had children under the age of 18 living with them, 46.4% were married couples living together, 12.3% had a female householder with no husband present, and 37.7% were non-families. 34.0% of all households were made up of individuals, and 19.5% had someone living alone who was 65 years of age or older. The average household size was 2.26 and the average family size was 2.92.

In the borough the population was spread out, with 20.0% under the age of 18, 6.5% from 18 to 24, 27.3% from 25 to 44, 23.4% from 45 to 64, and 22.9% who were 65 years of age or older. The median age was 42 years. For every 100 females, there were 82.4 males. For every 100 females age 18 and over, there were 77.5 males.

The median income for a household in the borough was $33,030, and the median income for a family was $41,729. Males had a median income of $35,386 versus $20,656 for females. The per capita income for the borough was $20,370. About 9.6% of families and 10.1% of the population were below the poverty line, including 20.5% of those under age 18 and 8.4% of those age 65 or over.

Culture
West Pittston has an annual Cherry Blossom Festival. The event usually consists of bands, food, and a parade. The parade includes the Wyoming Area Marching Band, Little League teams, Boy Scout troops, and various local emergency service crews. The festival also includes musical concerts, skit shows, and a Miss Cherry Blossom contest.

Sister city is Gualdo Tadino, Italy

Notable people
 Annabel Morris Holvey (1855–1910), newspaper editor, social reformer
 Marion Lorne, actress, born in West Pittston
 Anne Sargent, actress
 Susan E. Dickinson, journalist

References

External links
 
 West Pittston Historical Society
 West Pittston Cherry Blossom Festival

Pennsylvania populated places on the Susquehanna River
Populated places established in 1778
Boroughs in Luzerne County, Pennsylvania
1857 establishments in Pennsylvania